The uses of heraldry in Bosnia and Herzegovina is used by government bodies, subdivisions of the national government, organizations, corporations and by families.

References

See also

 Coat of Arms
 Heraldry
 History of Bosnia and Herzegovina
 Coat of arms of the Federation of Bosnia and Herzegovina
 Seal of Republika Srpska

Bosnia and Herzegovina coats of arms
Heraldry by country